Arizona's 5th Legislative District is one of 30 in the state, covering all of La Paz County, and the vast majority of Mohave County. As of 2021, there are 33 precincts in the district, 22 in Mohave and 11 in La Paz, with a total registered voter population of 148,026. The district has an overall population of 224,856.

Political representation
The district is represented for the 2021–2022 Legislative Session in the State Senate by Sonny Borrelli (R) and in the House of Representatives by Regina Cobb (R) and Leo Biasiucci (R).

See also
 List of Arizona Legislative Districts
 Arizona State Legislature

References

Mohave County, Arizona
La Paz County, Arizona
Arizona legislative districts